Topdağ Railway Station is a railway station in the village of Topdağ in the Kars Province of Turkey. The station is serviced by the Eastern Express, operated by the Turkish State Railways, running between İstanbul and Kars.

References

Railway stations in Kars Province
Railway stations opened in 1916